Kotma tehsil is a fourth-order administrative and revenue division, a subdivision of third-order administrative and revenue division of Anuppur district of Madhya Pradesh.

Geography
Kotma tehsil has an area of 305.08 sq kilometers. It is bounded by Anuppur tehsil in the northwest, southwest and south, Chhattisgarh in the north, northeast, east and southeast and Shahdol district in the west.

See also 
Anuppur district

References

External links

Tehsils of Madhya Pradesh
Anuppur district